Solenoceridae is a family of decapods, containing 10 genera. Members of this family are marine, inhabiting shallow and offshore waters from the mid-continental shelf, ranging from depths to 1000 meters deep. Members of this family are also sometimes confused with other commercial shrimp species.

Genera
 Cryptopenaeus de Freitas, 1979
 Gordonella Tirmizi, 1960
 Hadropenaeus Pérez Farfante, 1977
 Haliporoides Stebbing, 1914
 Haliporus Spence Bate, 1881
 Hymenopenaeus Smith, 1882
 Maximiliaeus Chan, 2012
 Mesopenaeus Pérez Farfante, 1977
 Pleoticus Spence Bate, 1888
 Solenocera Lucas, 1849

References

Decapods
Decapod families
Taxa named by James Wood-Mason

Solenoceridae